Partridge Family 2200 A.D. is an American science fiction Saturday-morning animated series and a spin-off of the 1970–1974 ABC live-action sitcom The Partridge Family produced by Hanna-Barbera Productions and Columbia Pictures Television and broadcast on CBS from September 7 to December 21, 1974, though, it would air in reruns until March 8, 1975. The band performed one of their pop hits in each episode.

Production
While in pre-production, Hanna-Barbera originally proposed an updated version of The Jetsons, in which Elroy would be a teenager and Judy would have a steady job as an ace reporter. CBS, under the leadership of Fred Silverman, discarded the idea and decided to make an animated version of The Partridge Family instead. The Partridge Family had already been recurring characters on a previous Hanna-Barbera production, Goober and the Ghost Chasers.

In this new iteration of the series, The Partridge Family is—without any explanation—living in a Jetsons-like futuristic environment in 2200 A.D.  The family's "galaxy-famous" musical act is notably more successful than in the live-action show, and they appear to manage themselves:  the character of Ruben Kincaid is not a regular.  Danny has a robotic dog named Orbit, and Keith and Laurie have two good friends that travel with the family (though they are not part of the musical act):  Marion, a two-toned green and blue Martian who can fly, and Veenie, a purple-haired Venusian with a distinct buzzing vocal tic.

Danny Bonaduce, Suzanne Crough, and Brian Forster voiced their respective characters from the live action series. Susan Dey provided Laurie's voice for only two episodes before she was replaced by former Mouseketeer Sherry Alberoni, who had voiced Alexandra for Hanna-Barbera's Josie and the Pussycats. Chuck McLenan served as both the speaking and singing voice of Keith Partridge instead of David Cassidy; Joan Gerber voiced Shirley Partridge in place of Shirley Jones, while John Stephenson took over the role of Reuben Kincaid from Dave Madden in the few episodes in which he appears.

Micky Dolenz, a member of a previous made-for-television band (The Monkees), had various recurring roles in the series, one of his first voice-over roles.

Sixteen half-hour episodes were produced for Partridge Family 2200 A.D., which lasted half a season on CBS Saturday morning (September 7, 1974 – March 8, 1975). In 1977–78, it was retitled The Partridge Family in Outer Space when episodes were serialized on the syndicated weekday series Fred Flintstone and Friends. Like many animated series created by Hanna-Barbera in the 1970s, the series contained a laugh track created by the studio.

Due to its ties to The Partridge Family, Partridge Family 2200 A.D. is one of only two Hanna-Barbera produced series since H-B's 1967 sale to Taft Broadcasting that are owned outright by Sony Pictures Television (whose predecessor, Screen Gems, produced the live-action series); Jeannie (an animated spin-off of I Dream of Jeannie) is the other (the copyrights to both animated series are currently held by CPT Holdings).

Cast
 Sherry Alberoni as Laurie Partridge
 Danny Bonaduce as Danny Partridge
 Suzanne Crough as Tracy Partridge
 Susan Dey as Laurie Partridge (in 2 episodes)
 Brian Forster as Chris Partridge
 Joan Gerber as Shirley Partridge, Energetic Emma
 Chuck McLenan as Keith Partridge, Zappy Zak
 Micky Dolenz as Wonderful Wayne, Spotless Sam
 Julie McWhirter as Marion Moonglow
 Hal Smith as Texx
 John Stephenson as Reuben Kincaid
 Lennie Weinrib as Jolly Joe
 Frank Welker as Orbit, Veenie

Chuck McLenan also was the singing voice for musical numbers.

Episodes

Production credits
 Executive Producers: Joseph Barbera, William Hanna
 Directed by Charles A. Nichols
 Creative Producer: Iwao Takamoto
 Recording Director: Gordon Hunt
 Assistant Director: Maxine Hoppe
 Executive Story Consultant: Myles Wilder
 Story Editor: Sid Morse
 Writers: Barry Blitzer, Larz Bourne, Dick Conway and Buddy Atkinson, Rance Howard and Jim Begg, Jack Mendelsohn, John Fenton Murray, Ray Parker, Bill Raynor
 Storyboard Editors: Lew Marshall, Don Sheppherd, George Singer, Paul Sommer
 Production Design: Bob Singer
 Production Supervision: Victor O. Schipek
 Titles: Iraj Paran
 Musical Director: Hoyt Curtin
 Music Supervision: Paul DeKorte
 Character Design: Dick Bickenbach
 Layout: Dale Barnhart, Sukhdev Dail, Phil Mendez, Greg Nocon
 Unit Director: Ray Patterson
 Animation: Ed Barge, O. E. Callahan, Lars Calonius, Rudy Cataldi, Margaret Gruwell, Bill Hutten, Volus Jones, Ed Love, Tony Love, Dan Mills, Don Patterson, John Walker, Gwen Wetzier
 Background Supervision: Fernando Montealegre
 Background: Dennis Durrell, Joe Griffith, Robert Schaefer, Dennis Venizelos
 Technical Supervision: Frank Palker
 Checking and Scene Planning: Evelyn Sherwood
 Ink and Paint Supervision: Billie Kerns
 Xerography: Robert "Tiger" West
 Sound Direction: Richard Olson, Bill Getty
 Supervising Film Editor: Larry Cowan
 Music Editor: Joe Sandusky
 Sound Effects Editor: Joe Reitano
 Negative Consultant: William E. DeBoer
 Post Production Supervision: Joed Eaton
 Camera: George Epperson, Jerry Smith, Wayne Smith
 Production Manager: Art Scott
 Assistant Production Manager: Jayne Barbera
 A Hanna-Barbera Production
 RCA Sound Recording
 Hanna-Barbera Productions, Inc. ©MCMLXXIV-MCMLXXVII All Rights Reserved.
 This Picture made under the Jurisdiction of IATSE-IA Affiliated with A.F.L.-C.I.O.
 Hanna-Barbera Productions, Inc.
 Columbia Pictures Television, A division of Columbia Pictures Industries, Inc.

Home media
In October 2005, two restored episodes of Partridge Family 2200 A.D., "My Son, The Spaceball Star" and "Car Trouble", were included as bonuses on The Partridge Family: The Complete First Season DVD set.

See also
 List of animated spin-offs from prime time shows

References

External links
 
 Partridge Family: 2200 A.D. at the Big Cartoon DataBase
 Partridge Family 2200 A.D.

1974 American television series debuts
1974 American television series endings
1970s American animated television series
American animated television spin-offs
American children's animated comic science fiction television series
American children's animated space adventure television series
CBS original programming
English-language television shows
Television series by Hanna-Barbera
Television series by Sony Pictures Television
Television series set in the future
Television series set in the 22nd century
The Partridge Family
Animation based on real people
Animated musical groups
Animated television series about children
Animated television series about families